The 1985 Florida Gators football team represented the University of Florida during the 1985 NCAA Division I-A football season. The season was the second for Galen Hall as the head coach of the Florida Gators football team, having coached the 1984 Gators' final eight games as their interim coach.  Because of NCAA probation terms handed down the previous year, Hall's 1985 Florida Gators were ineligible to win the Southeastern Conference (SEC) title, receive a bowl bid, or appear on live television.

Schedule

Roster

Game summaries

at Miami (FL)

vs. Georgia

Florida State

Postseason

After the season, Sagarin Ratings (ELO-Chess), one of two NCAA recognized selectors created by Jeff Sagarin, an MIT math graduate and sports statistician, named Florida as the 1985 national champions, though Florida does not claim the title. Florida finished with a 9–1–1 overall record and an SEC record of 5–1, tying for first place in the ten-team SEC.

References

Florida
Florida Gators football seasons
Florida Gators football